Geyikbayırı, Konyaaltı is a village in the district of Antalya, near the ancient city of Trebenna, in Antalya Province, Turkey.

References

Konyaaltı District
Villages in Antalya District